Whither Canada? may refer to:

 A proposed title for Monty Python's Flying Circus
 An episode of Monty Python's Flying Circus